The Capital Wind Farm near Bungendore is the largest wind farm in New South Wales.  It is part of the  Capital Renewable Energy Precinct, along with nearby Woodlawn Wind Farm and the Capital East Solar Demonstration Plant.

Capital Wind Farm was built by international contractors Suzlon Energy for owner and operator Infigen Energy.  Construction began in early 2008, and the wind farm became fully operational in October 2009. It is a 140.7 megawatt wind farm with 67 turbines.

In 2009, the project was expected to have a capacity factor of 35.8%, and thus generate on average 441 GWh of energy per year. However, from 2011 to 2020 it ran at an average of 27.88% capacity factor, with a corresponding annual generation of 343.66 GWh.

Location
It is located in open farming country, with minimal obstructions in the landscape and smooth topography.

Construction
The Capital Wind Farm was built for Infigen Energy by Suzlon Energy.  It was constructed as part of the Kurnell Desalination Plant project to offset the power usage of the desalination plant.

The wind farm was completed in October 2009 at a cost estimated between A$220 million and A$370 million. It was opened by the Prime Minister at the time, Kevin Rudd, in November 2009.

People and employment
Since the wind farm was established, the population of nearby Bungendore has increased by 24 per cent, which the Clean Energy Council has claimed is because of its proximity to the wind farm.

During the construction of the Capital Wind Farm, 120 people were employed on the project. Over the construction period, about A$10 million went into the local economy, with spending up at the local stores, restaurants and motels. Since construction has finished there are 15 ongoing jobs at the wind farm for service and maintenance.

Some residents who live nearby to the Capital Wind Farm have complained about the noise from the turbines.

Operations 
The generation table uses eljmkt nemlog to obtain generation values for each month.

Note: Records date back to 2011.

See also

Wind power in Australia
List of wind farms in New South Wales

References

Wind farms in New South Wales